The 2015 CONCACAF Women's U-20 Championship qualification was a women's under-20 football competition which decided the participating teams of the 2015 CONCACAF Women's U-20 Championship. Players born on or after 1 January 1996 were eligible to compete in the tournament.

A total of eight teams qualified to play in the final tournament, where the berths were allocated to the three regional zones as follows:
Three teams from the North American Zone (NAFU), i.e., Canada, Mexico and the United States, who all qualified automatically
Two teams from the Central American Zone (UNCAF), including Honduras who qualified automatically as hosts
Three teams from the Caribbean Zone (CFU)

The top three teams of the final tournament qualified for the 2016 FIFA U-20 Women's World Cup in Papua New Guinea.

Teams
A total of 23 CONCACAF member national teams entered the tournament. Among them, four teams qualified automatically for the final tournament, and 19 teams entered the regional qualifying competitions.

Notes
1 Non-FIFA member, ineligible for World Cup.

Central American Zone

In the Central American Zone, initially six UNCAF member national teams entered the qualifying competition. They were divided into two groups of three teams, as drawn on 28 February 2015 at the UNCAF Executive Committee meeting in Managua, Nicaragua. Group A, consisting of Panama, Honduras and El Salvador, was to be played between 23–27 June 2015 in Panama, while Group B, consisting of Costa Rica, Nicaragua and Guatemala, was to be played between 1–5 July 2015 in Costa Rica. The two group winners would qualify for the final tournament as the UNCAF representatives.

However, after Honduras were named as hosts and qualified automatically, UNCAF changed the format of the qualifying competition. The five remaining teams were placed in a single group, as confirmed on 3 June 2015 by UNCAF. The matches were played between 31 July and 8 August 2015 in Panama. The winner qualified for the final tournament as the UNCAF representative besides hosts Honduras.

Times UTC−5.

Group

Goalscorers
4 goals

 Katherine Arroyo
 Melissa Herrera

3 goals

 Brenda Cerén
 Celeste Gatica
 Yassiel Franco

2 goals
 Marta Cox

1 goal

 María Paula Coto
 Sofía Varela
 Gloriana Villalobos
 Heylin Jiménez
 Karla Rodríguez
 Alida Argueta
 Fabiola González
 Vivian Herrera
 Amelia Rabanales
 Madelin Ventura
 Sheyla Flores
 Yessenia Flores
 Jackeline Melgar
 Solemar Ortiz
 Karla Riley

Note: One goal each scored by Guatemala and Nicaragua missing goalscorer information.

Caribbean Zone

In the Caribbean Zone, 14 CFU member national teams entered the qualifying competition. Among them, 13 teams entered the first round, where they were divided into one group of four teams and three groups of three teams. The groups were played between 19–23 June and 26–30 July 2015 and hosted by one of the teams in each group. The four group winners, the runner-up of the four-team group, and the two best runners-up of the three-team groups advanced to the final round to be joined by final round hosts Haiti.

In the final round, played between 14–23 October 2015 in Haiti, the eight teams were divided into two groups of four teams, where the top two teams of each group advanced to play a single-elimination tournament. The top three teams qualified for the final tournament as the CFU representatives.

Times UTC−4.

First round

Group 1
Matches played in Puerto Rico.

Group 2
Matches played in Saint Lucia.

The final match was postponed due to heavy rain. It was eventually not played, and Jamaica advanced to the final round.

Group 3
Matches played in Dominican Republic.

Group 4
Matches played in Saint Vincent and the Grenadines.

Ranking of second-placed teams
In addition to the runner-up of Group 1 (with four teams), the two best runners-up of Groups 2, 3 and 4 (with three teams) also advance to the final round.

Final round
Matches played in Haiti.

Group A

Group B

Semi-finals
Winners qualified for 2015 CONCACAF Women's U-20 Championship.

Third place playoff
Winner qualified for 2015 CONCACAF Women's U-20 Championship.

Final

Goalscorers
7 goals
 Khadija Shaw

6 goals

 Aaliyah Nolan
 Marjorie Martínez

4 goals

 Winibian Peralta
 Nérilia Mondésir
 Adriana Tirado
 Tsaianne Leander

3 goals

 Deneisha Blackwood
 Maya Matouk

2 goals

 Eva Frazzoni
 Lindsay Hart
 Amalie Gunn
 Emeli Sosa
 Roneisha Frank
 Sabine Chandler
 Kensia Destinvil
 Roseline Éloissaint
 Rasha Roberts
 Ángela Díaz
 Mirianée Zaragoza
 Darie-Ann Duncan
 Chevonne John

1 goal

 Coleen Johnson
 Jaidene Browne
 Kshalea Burch
 Deshae Darrell
 Juvainy Keller
 Diante Scheepers
 Ketsiah Wahr
 Kasika Samuel
 Kristal Julien
 Shaunasha Prevost
 Batcheba Louis
 Darline Radamaker
 Rena Gordon
 Asia Lee-Fatt
 Simone Wark
 Karla Aponte
 Alejandra Carrión
 Adriana Font
 Ilandra Guadalupe
 Mariana López
 Gabriela Solís
 Jessica Torres
 Criselda Cox
 Lyla Lionel
 Chrislyn Browne
 Teffie-Ann Browne
 Corel Carmichael
 Shauna-Lee Govia
 Kelsey Henry
 Kedie Johnson
 Chelcy Ralph
 Zoe Swift
 Celeste Thomas

Own goal
 Konya Plummer (playing against Saint Vincent and the Grenadines)

Qualified teams
The following eight teams qualified for the final tournament.

1 Bold indicates champion for that year. Italic indicates host for that year.

References

External links
Under 20s – Women, CONCACAF.com
Fútbol Femenino Sub-20, UNCAFut.com 
Women's U20, CFUfootball.org

Qualification
Women's U-20 Championship qualification
Concacaf Women's U-20 Championship qualification
2015 in youth sport
2015